Elisa Stefani (born 4 May 1986) is an Italian long-distance runner. In 2020, she competed in the women's half marathon at the 2020 World Athletics Half Marathon Championships held in Gdynia, Poland.

References

External links 
 

Living people
1986 births
Place of birth missing (living people)
Italian female long-distance runners
Italian female marathon runners
Italian Athletics Championships winners
20th-century Italian women
21st-century Italian women